Ford Vietnam was established in 1995, and is a joint venture between Ford Motor Company (75%) and Song Cong Diesel Company (25%). Ford's investment is credited with helping industrialize Vietnam. Ford Vietnam has its headquarters in Hanoi with an office in Ho Chi Minh City and an assembly plant located in Hai Duong province - 55 km east from Hanoi, with the capacity of 14,000 vehicles per year until a 2018 expansion.  In January 2020, Ford announced increased investment that would further expand capacity to 40,000 vehicles per year.

Ford Vietnam is the first automotive manufacturer in Vietnam receiving ISO 9001, ISO 14001 and QS9000 accreditation, ISO/TS16949 - 2002.

References

Ford Motor Company
Vehicle manufacturing companies established in 1995
Manufacturing companies based in Hanoi
Car manufacturers of Vietnam
Vietnamese companies established in 1995